Ranuli Ice Piedmont is the glacier extending  in south-southeast to north-northwest direction and  in west-southwest to east-northeast direction on the east side of Sentinel Range in Ellsworth Mountains, Antarctica.  It is draining the east slopes of Barnes Ridge to flow into Rutford Ice Stream to the east-northeast, Young Glacier to the north, and Ellen Glacier to the south.

The feature is named after the ancient town of Ranuli in southeastern Bulgaria.

Location
US mapping in 1988.

See also
 List of glaciers in the Antarctic
 Glaciology

Maps
 Vinson Massif.  Scale 1:250 000 topographic map.  Reston, Virginia: US Geological Survey, 1988.
 Antarctic Digital Database (ADD). Scale 1:250000 topographic map of Antarctica. Scientific Committee on Antarctic Research (SCAR). Since 1993, regularly updated.

References

External links
 Ranuli Ice Piedmont SCAR Composite Antarctic Gazetteer
 Bulgarian Antarctic Gazetteer. Antarctic Place-names Commission. (details in Bulgarian, basic data in English)

External links
 Ranuli Ice Piedmont. Copernix satellite image

Glaciers of Ellsworth Land
Bulgaria and the Antarctic